The 7th Politburo of the Workers' Party of Korea (WPK), officially the Political Bureau of the 7th Central Committee of the Workers' Party of Korea, was elected by the 1st Plenary Session of the 7th Central Committee, in the immediate aftermath of the 7th WPK Congress. The composition of the 7th Politburo was changed on several occasions by plenary sessions of the 7th WPK Central Committee.

Members elected at the 1st Plenary Session

Alternates elected at the 1st Plenary Session

Changes

References

7th Politburo of the Workers' Party of Korea